Hoot (subtitled 009) is the third extended play by the South Korean girl group Girls' Generation. The extended play contains five songs and was released on 27 October 2010, by SM Entertainment.

The album is listed by Gaon Album Chart as the third best-selling album of 2010 in South Korea, with 163,066 copies sold.

Composition
Contributions to the album's production came from Wheesung, Jinu (Hitchhiker), Kenzie and the former Roommate and Nadia member Hwang Hyun. The title song, "Hoot", was composed by the Danish songwriter-producers Martin Michael Larsson and Lars Halvor Jensen, of Deekay, together with the British songwriter Alex James, with the intention of creating an "exciting up-tempo record for a female artist or group". It was originally titled "Bulletproof" and written with English lyrics.

"Mistake" is the second track and a R&B ballad with lyrics by Kwon Yuri which is about a girl who can't move on from a relationship with a guy who asked her to "wait" for him but in the end he found another and she blames herself for not trying harder to keep the love between them. The third track "My Best Friend" is a contemporary R&B song with lyrics by Wheesung that talks about each other's friendship of Girls' Generation. The fourth track "Wake Up" is an electropop song carrying dark synth beat-sounds with medium tempo shuffle rhythm. "Snowy Wish" is the fifth track and a bright dance-pop song.

Single
Hoot debuted at #1 on 30 October 2010 on the Gaon Chart. The song won Triple Crown on Inkigayo on 28 November 2010 and won five times on Music Bank of KBS. The song demo was written and recorded in the UK, with Nina Woodford singing the vocal, and then finished and mixed in Denmark.

Promotion
They held their comeback stage show on 29 October 2010 on KBS's Music Bank. It was also performed on Show! Music Core, Inkigayo and M! Countdown. They held their final stage show on 4 December 2010 on MBC's Show! Music Core.

Commercial performance
A day before the official release of Hoot, it was reported that it had received over 150,000 sales in pre-orders. The album achieved gold status in Japan for selling 100,000 copies. The album is listed by Gaon Album Chart as the third best-selling album of 2010 in South Korea, with 163,066 copies sold.

Track listing
Credits adapted from Naver

Charts and certifications

Weekly charts

Year-end charts

Sales and certifications

Release history

References

External links
 
 

2010 EPs
Girls' Generation albums
SM Entertainment EPs
Korean-language EPs